Moszczenica is a river of Poland, a tributary of the Bzura near Orłów-Kolonia.

Rivers of Poland
Rivers of Łódź Voivodeship